Singer Rosemary Clooney (May 23, 1928 – June 29, 2002) is known for many songs, including "Come On-a My House", "Botch-a-Me", "Mambo Italiano", "Tenderly", "Half as Much", "Hey There" and "This Ole House". This is a partial discography.

Singles discography

Albums
 1952: Hollywood's Best (with Harry James) (10" Lp)
 1954: Red Garters (with Guy Mitchell and Joanne Gilbert) (10" Lp)
 1954: While We're Young (10" Lp)
 1954: Irving Berlin's White Christmas (10" Lp)
 1955: Tenderly (10" Lp)
 1955: Children's Favorites (10" Lp)
 1955: Hollywood's Best (with Harry James) (12" Lp)
 1956: Blue Rose (with Duke Ellington)
 1956: Date with the King (with Benny Goodman) (10" LP)
 1956: My Fair Lady (10" LP)
 1956: On Stage (live at the London Palladium) (10" LP)
 1957: Ring Around Rosie (with The Hi-Lo's)
 1957: Clooney Tunes
 1958: The Ferrers (with José Ferrer)
 1958: The Ferrers at Home (with José Ferrer)
 1958: Swing Around Rosie (with the Buddy Cole trio)
 1958: Fancy Meeting You Here (with Bing Crosby)
 1958: In High Fidelity
 1958: Oh, Captain!
 1959: Hymns From the Heart
 1959: A Touch of Tabasco (with Perez Prado)
 1959: Hollywood Hits
 1959: Mixed Emotions
 1960: How the West Was Won (with Bing Crosby)
 1960: Rosie Swings Softly
 1960: Clap Hands! Here Comes Rosie!
 1961: Rosie Solves the Swingin' Riddle! (with Nelson Riddle)
 1961: Rosemary Clooney Sings for Children
 1963: Rosemary Clooney Sings Country Hits from the Heart
 1963: Love (recorded 1961)
 1964: Thanks for Nothing
 1965: That Travelin' Two Beat - Bing Crosby and Rosemary Clooney (with Bing Crosby)
 1976: Look My Way
 1977: Nice to Be Around
 1977: A Tribute to Duke
 1977: Everything's Coming Up Rosie
 1978: Christmas with Rosemary Clooney (recorded 1976)
 1978: Rosie Sings Bing
 1979: Here's to My Lady
 1979: Rosemary Clooney Sings the Lyrics of Ira Gershwin
 1981: With Love
 1982: Rosemary Clooney Sings the Music of Cole Porter
 1983: Rosemary Clooney With Les Brown and his Band of Renown
 1983: Rosemary Clooney Sings the Music of Harold Arlen
 1983: My Buddy (with Woody Herman)
 1984: Rosemary Clooney Sings the Music of Irving Berlin
 1985: Rosemary Clooney Sings Ballads
 1986: Rosemary Clooney Sings the Music of Jimmy Van Heusen
 1987: Rosemary Clooney Sings the Lyrics of Johnny Mercer
 1989: Show Tunes
 1989: 16 Most Requested Songs
 1990: Rosemary Clooney Sings Rodgers, Hart & Hammerstein
 1991: For the Duration
 1992: Girl Singer
 1993: Do You Miss New York?
 1994: Still on the Road
 1995: Demi-Centennial
 1996: Dedicated to Nelson
 1996: White Christmas
 1997: Mothers & Daughters
 1998: At Long Last (with the Count Basie Orchestra)
 2000: Out of This World
 2000: Brazil (with John Pizzarelli)
 2001: Sentimental Journey: The Girl Singer and Her New Big Band
 2001: A Very Special Christmas with Rosemary Clooney
 2002: The Last Concert (live)

References

Vocal jazz discographies